Sumita Basu Mitra (born 1949) is an Indian-American inventor who is a professor at the University of South Florida. She developed the nanomaterials used in state-of-the-art 3M dental composites, which have been used in billions of procedures around the world. She is a Fellow of the National Academy of Engineering, National Academy of Inventors and the National Inventors Hall of Fame.

Early life and education 
Mitra was born in India, where she spent her childhood. She was an undergraduate student at Presidency College Calcutta and majored in chemistry. After graduating, she joined the University of Calcutta for a master's degree in chemistry. She moved to the United States for graduate studies and specialized in polymer chemistry. She was based at the University of Michigan, where she worked alongside Richard Lawton. She joined Case Western Reserve University as a postdoctoral fellow in polymer chemistry.

Research and career 
In 1978, Mitra joined 3M, where she worked as a senior chemist focusing on materials for health care. She specialized in nanotechnology, adhesion science and surface chemistry. In particular, she focused on the realization of smart materials to help in dentistry. At the time, dentists performed tooth repairs using a combination of two different materials, microfills and microhybrid composites. Mitra designed the nanomaterials-based filler platform that 3M uses for all state-of-the-art dental restoratives. Nanoparticles ('nanomeric filler particles') within these materials imitate the natural enamel of teeth, which allow them to remain glossy and strong. She showed that these materials could be used to restore teeth in any area of the mouth. These platforms enabled the realization of the Filtek composites. These composites have been used in hundreds of millions of procedures around the world. The first generation of the composites were launched in 2002 and the second generation in 2005.

After retiring from 3M in 2010, Mitra established her own consulting company. She joined the Institute for Advanced Discovery at the University of South Florida in 2021.
Mitra holds almost one hundred patents in nano composites and dental adhesives.

Awards and honors 
 1998 Inducted into 3M's Carlton Society
 2004 American Chemical Society Regional Industrial Innovation Award
 2009 American Chemical Society “Heroes of Chemistry Award”
 2012 Peyton-Skinner Award for Innovation in Dental Materials
 2018 Elected to the National Inventors Hall of Fame
 2021 Elected to the National Academy of Engineering
 2021 European Inventor Award
 2021 Elected to the National Academy of Inventors

Selected publications

References 

American people of Indian descent
1949 births

Living people
University of South Florida faculty
Women chemists
University of Calcutta alumni
Case Western Reserve University faculty
Fellows of the National Academy of Inventors
3M people